Varbon may refer to:
 Varbon, Gilan
 Varbon, Qazvin